is a Japanese web novel series written by Konoe. It began serialization online in December 2019 on the user-generated novel publishing website Shōsetsuka ni Narō. No printed version of the novel series has been published yet. A manga adaptation with art by Kenji Taguchi has been serialized online via Shogakukan's Sunday Webry website, as well as the seinen manga magazine Monthly Sunday Gene-X, since March 2020. It has been collected in nine tankōbon volumes. An anime television series adaptation by Gekkō will premiere in April 2023.

Characters

Media

Novel
The series written by Konoe began serialization online as a web novel on December 28, 2019 on the user-generated novel publishing site Shōsetsuka ni Narō. A print version of the novel has not been published as of yet.

Manga
A manga adaptation with art by Kenji Taguchi has been serialized online via Shogakukan's Sunday Webry website since March 6, 2020, as well as the seinen manga magazine Monthly Sunday Gene-X since April 17 of the same year. It has been collected in nine tankōbon volumes.

Anime
On March 11, 2022, an anime adaptation was announced on the seventh volume of the manga. It was later confirmed to be a television series animated by Gekkō and directed by Hiroaki Takagi, with Yōhei Kashii in charge of series' scripts, Yūji Hamada designing the characters, and Kenichi Kanagawa designing the monsters. It will premiere on April 8, 2023, on Tokyo MX and other networks. TrySail will perform the opening theme song , while VALIS will perform the ending theme song . On August 6, 2022, during their industry panel at Crunchyroll Expo, Crunchyroll announced that they have licensed the series outside of Asia.

See also
Ane Log, another manga series written and illustrated by Kenji Taguchi

References

External links
 at Shōsetsuka ni Narō 
Manga official website 
Anime official website 

2023 anime television series debuts
Anime and manga based on novels
Crunchyroll anime
Isekai anime and manga
Isekai novels and light novels
Japanese webcomics
Seinen manga
Shogakukan manga
Shōsetsuka ni Narō
Tokyo MX original programming
Upcoming anime television series
Webcomics in print